Gautambhaiji Gopabhaiji Chauhan is an Indian politician, social worker and incumbent member of Gujarat Legislative Assembly as a member of Bharatiya Janata Party. In 2022 Gujarat Legislative Assembly election, Chauhan defeated Kanubhai Baraiya of Indian National Congress and won the Talaja Assembly constituency seat.

References 

Living people
1974 births
People from Bhavnagar district
Gujarat MLAs 2022–2027
21st-century Indian politicians
Bharatiya Janata Party politicians from Gujarat